Ráztočno is a village and municipality in Prievidza District in the Trenčín Region of central Slovakia.

History
In historical records the village was first mentioned in 1429.

Geography
The municipality lies at an elevation of 350 metres (1,150 ft) and covers an area of 17.593 km2 (6.793 mi2). It has a population of about 1237.

External links
http://www.statistics.sk/mosmis/eng/run.html

Villages and municipalities in Prievidza District